Giovanni de Rossi (died 1667) was a Roman Catholic prelate who served as Bishop of Ossero (1653–1667), Bishop of Chiron (1645–1653), and Bishop of Cefalonia e Zante (1640–1645).

Biography
On 3 December 1640, Giovanni de Rossi was appointed during the papacy of Pope Urban VIII as Bishop of Cefalonia e Zante. On 9 December 1640, he was consecrated bishop by Giulio Cesare Sacchetti, Cardinal-Priest of Santa Susanna, with Leonardo Mocenigo, Archbishop of Candia, and Lelio Falconieri, Titular Archbishop of Thebae, serving as co-consecrators. On 10 July 1645, he was appointed during the papacy of Pope Innocent X as Bishop of Chiron. On 10 November 1653, he was appointed during the papacy of Pope Innocent X as Bishop of Ossero. He served as Bishop of Ossero until his death in 1667.

References 

17th-century Roman Catholic bishops in Croatia
Bishops appointed by Pope Urban VIII
Bishops appointed by Pope Innocent X
Year of birth unknown
1667 deaths
17th-century Roman Catholic bishops in the Republic of Venice